The Information and Communication Technology Authority is a Kenyan Government Owned Corporation tasked with rationalising and streamlining the management of all the Information and Communication Technology (ICT) functions of the Government of Kenya. The ICTA has a broad mandate that entails enforcing ICT standards in government and enhancing the supervision of its electronic communication. The authority also promotes ICT literacy, capacity, innovation and enterprise in line with the Kenya National ICT Masterplan 2017.

The ICTA is a consolidation of three previously separate government agencies; the Information and Communication Technology Board of Kenya (ICT Board), the e-Government Directorate and the Government Information and Technology Services (GITS).

Board of directors
 Hon. Edwin Ochieng Yinda (Chairman)
 Ugas Mohammed
 Bertha Dena
 Professor Elijah Omwenga
 Professor Timothy Mwololo Waema
 Esther Njeri Kibere
 David Mugo

References

External links
 'ICT Authority'

2013 establishments in Kenya
Government agencies established in 2013
Government agencies of Kenya
Information and communication technologies in Africa
Science and technology in Kenya
Organisations based in Nairobi